Haidar Abu Bakr al-Attas (born April 5, 1939) was appointed Prime Minister of Yemen by President Ali Abdullah Saleh when the People's Democratic Republic of Yemen and Yemen Arab Republic united in 1990 to form present-day Yemen.  Al-Attas served until 1994.  He is a member of the Yemeni Socialist Party.

Before unification, al-Attas served as Prime Minister (1985–1986) and Chairman of the Presidium of the Supreme People's Council (1986–1990) in the southern PDRY.

When Aden in southern Yemen seceded in May 1994, al-Attas served as the Prime Minister of the secessionist Democratic Republic of Yemen until the rebellion ended less than two months later.

References

1939 births
Living people
Presidents of South Yemen
Prime Ministers of South Yemen
Chairmen of the Presidium of the Supreme People's Council
Prime Ministers of Yemen
Yemeni Socialist Party politicians
Yemeni socialists
Communism in Yemen
20th-century prime ministers of Yemen
Attas Cabinet